The Edwards Professor of Medieval History is a professorship at the University of Glasgow, in Scotland.

Founded in 1955 as the Chair of Medieval History the name was changed in 1989 to commemorate the Glasgow scholar and antiquarian John Edwards (1846-1937).

Professors of Medieval History/Edwards Professors of Medieval History 
 Edward Lionel Gregory Stones MA PhD (1956)
 Alfred Lawson Brown MA DPhil FRHistS (1978)
 David Bates BA PhD (1994)
 Julia Mary Howard Smith (2005-2016)

See also
List of Professorships at the University of Glasgow
Professor of Modern History, Glasgow
Professor of Scottish History and Literature, Glasgow

References
Who, What and Where: The History and Constitution of the University of Glasgow. Compiled by Michael Moss, Moira Rankin and Lesley Richmond)

Medieval History, Edwards
Medieval History, Edwards
1955 establishments in Scotland
Medieval studies